Dodson Township is one of the seventeen townships of Highland County, Ohio, United States. As of the 2010 census the population was 2,607, of whom 1,110 lived in the unincorporated portion of the township.

Geography
Located in the northwestern corner of the county, it borders the following townships:
Clark Township, Clinton County - north
Union Township - northeast
Hamer Township - southeast
Salem Township - south
Perry Township, Brown County - west
Jefferson Township, Clinton County - northwest

Part of the village of Lynchburg is located in northern Dodson Township.

Name and history
Dodson Township derives its name from Joshua Dodson, a government surveyor. It is the only Dodson Township statewide.

Government
The township is governed by a three-member board of trustees, who are elected in November of odd-numbered years to a four-year term beginning on the following January 1. Two are elected in the year after the presidential election and one is elected in the year before it. There is also an elected township fiscal officer, who serves a four-year term beginning on April 1 of the year after the election, which is held in November of the year before the presidential election. Vacancies in the fiscal officership or on the board of trustees are filled by the remaining trustees.

References

External links
County website

Townships in Highland County, Ohio
Townships in Ohio